Rovdefjorden is a fjord (more precisely, a strait) in Møre og Romsdal county, Norway.  The fjord runs through the municipalities of Sande, Herøy, Vanylven, Volda, Ørsta, and a tiny part of Ulstein.  The eastern end of the fjord connects with the Vartdalsfjorden and Voldsfjorden and the western end of the fjord connects with the Hallefjorden.  The Syvdsfjorden branches off the Rovdefjorden to the south.  The fjord is bounded by the mainland to the south and the island of Gurskøya to the north.

The area around the Rovdefjorden was once part of the municipality of Rovde from 1905 until 1964.  The area south of the Rovdefjorden is called Rovdestranda.  There are a few villages along the fjord, the largest of which is Rovdane, on the south shore in Vanylven Municipality.

See also
 List of Norwegian fjords

References

Fjords of Møre og Romsdal
Herøy, Møre og Romsdal
Vanylven
Sande, Møre og Romsdal
Ørsta